Chartered may refer to:
 Charter, a legal document conferring rights or privileges
 University charter
 Chartered company
 Chartered (professional), a professional credential
 Charter (shipping)
 Charter (airlines)
 Charter (typeface)
 Chartered Semiconductor Manufacturing, a manufacturing company

See also 
 Charter (disambiguation)